The following lists events that happened during 1961 in the Grand Duchy of Luxembourg.

Incumbents

Events

January – March
 18 March – Representing Luxembourg, Jean-Claude Pascal wins the Eurovision Song Contest 1961 with the song Nous les amoureux.

April – June
 28 April – Grand Duchess Charlotte declares her eldest son, Hereditary Grand Duke Jean, to be her Lieutenant Representative.
 5 May - Prince Félix is appointed to the Council of State.
 30 May - Joseph Wolter is appointed to the Council of State
 14 June - Joseph Kauffman is appointed to the Council of State

July – September
 10 July - Félix Worré is appointed to the Council of State
 17 July - Alex Bonn is appointed to the Council of State.
 7 August - Paul Weber is appointed to the Council of State.
 28 August - Victor Bodson is appointed to the Council of State.

October – December
 8 October – At football, Luxembourg beats Portugal 4–2, recording Luxembourg's first victory in international football since 1951.

Births
 24 March – Marc Schaeffer, member of the Council of State
 17 August – Lydia Mutsch, politician

Deaths

Footnotes

References